Manobala (born 8 December 1953) is an Indian film director, producer, actor and comedian who predominantly plays supporting roles in Tamil-language films.

He started his career in Tamil cinema in the early 1970s and with Kamal Haasan's reference became as assistant director with Bharathiraja for his 1979 film Puthiya Vaarpugal.

Partial filmography

Actor

Films

Serials

Director

Films

Serials

As producer

As dubbing artist

References

External links
 

Living people
Tamil male actors
Film directors from Tamil Nadu
Tamil film directors
Indian male film actors
People from Coimbatore district
Tamil comedians
1953 births
Indian male comedians
Male actors from Tamil Nadu
20th-century Indian film directors
20th-century Indian male actors
21st-century Indian film directors
21st-century Indian male actors
Tamil film producers
Film producers from Tamil Nadu
Male actors in Malayalam cinema
Tamil television directors